White Horse Tavern is a historic inn and tavern located in Douglassville, Amity Township, Berks County, Pennsylvania.  The building is situated on the banks of the Schuylkill River.  It was originally built in 1765, and is a -story, five-bay, sandstone building with a gable roof.  A -story, three-bay, addition was constructed in 1780. The building operated as an inn and tavern until 1870, when it was converted to a three-family residence.  The house was obtained in 1971, and subsequently restored by the Historic Preservation Trust of Berks County. It is part of the Morlatton Village historic site.

It was listed on the National Register of Historic Places in 1975.

See also
National Register of Historic Places listings in Berks County, Pennsylvania

References

External links
 Historic Preservation Trust of Berks County: White Horse Inn

Houses on the National Register of Historic Places in Pennsylvania
Georgian architecture in Pennsylvania
Houses completed in 1765
Houses in Berks County, Pennsylvania
National Register of Historic Places in Berks County, Pennsylvania